The Juliet Letters is a studio album by the British rock singer and songwriter Elvis Costello. It was released on compact disc as Warner Brothers 45180. The instrumental backing is provided by the Brodsky Quartet. Costello described the album as "a song sequence for string quartet and voice and it has a title. It's a little bit different. It's not a rock opera. It's a new thing." It peaked at No. 18 on the UK Albums Chart, and at No. 125 on the Billboard 200.

Content
Costello first encountered the Brodsky Quartet in 1989, a performance at the Queen Elizabeth Hall of the entire cycle of string quartets by Dmitri Shostakovich. They met for the first time in November 1991, to begin work on the concept and execution of this album project. Costello viewed this album as neither his first stab at classical music, nor the Brodsky's first attempt at rock and roll.

With a concept of imaginary letters being sent to an imaginary recipient, Juliet Capulet, all five musicians contributed to the writing of the lyrics as well as the music. No overdubs were made, the album recorded in its entirety live in the studio. One single was released from the album, the track "Jacksons, Monk, and Rowe," although it did not chart in either the United States or the UK.

Release history
The album was released initially on compact disc in 1993. As part of the Rhino Records reissue campaign for Costello's back catalogue from Demon/Columbia and Warners, it was re-released in 2006 with 18 additional tracks on a bonus disc. The bonus disc included additional musicians to Costello and the Brodsky Quartet, with some tracks recorded live at the 1995 Meltdown Festival. This reissue is out of print; the album was reissued again by Universal Music Group after its acquisition of Costello's complete catalogue in 2006.

Recordings and performances by other artists
Several artists have either recorded or mounted productions of the song cycle. It was recorded by Canadian singer Kerry-Anne Kutz and the Abysse String Quartet in February 2006. In September 2006, husband-and-wife duo Michelle and David Murray released a new version arranged for voice and piano by David Murray. In 2008, Jake Endres and the Theatrical Musical Company produced the first fully staged theatrical performance of The Juliet Letters, complete with two additional original songs. The production opened in September 2008 in Minneapolis at the Southern Theater. In 2009, a Polish singer-actress Katarzyna Groniec translated the whole Juliet Letters material into Polish, recorded and released it as Listy Julii with a band of trombone, saxophone, clarinet, French horn, tuba, flute, keyboards, bass guitar, and drums. In 2016, The Sacconi Quartet and Jon Boden (former lead singer of the folk group Bellowhead) performed The Juliet Letters in St Martin's Church, Colchester, as part of the Roman River Festival.
In 2016 the Norwegian singer Charlott-Renee Clasén and Østfold string quartet also performed the concert piece. Voice department faculty of the Berklee College of Music performed the music with a student string quartet in a recital on 18 April 2019.

Track listing
All songs written by Declan MacManus, except where noted; track timings taken from Rhino 2006 reissue.
 "Deliver Us" – 0:49
 "For Other Eyes" (MacManus, Paul Cassidy, Marina Thomas) – 2:55
 "Swine" (MacManus, Cassidy) – 2:08
 "Expert Rites" – 2:23
 "Dead Letter" (Cassidy) – 2:18
 "I Almost Had a Weakness" (MacManus, Michael Thomas) – 3:53
 "Why?" (MacManus, Ian Belton) – 1:26
 "Who Do You Think You Are?" (MacManus, Ma. Thomas, Mi. Thomas) – 3:28
 "Taking My Life in Your Hands" (MacManus, Jaqueline Thomas, Ma. Thomas, Cassidy) – 3:20
 "This Offer Is Unrepeatable" (MacManus, Cassidy, Belton, J. Thomas, Mi. Thomas) – 3:12
 "Dear Sweet Filthy World" (MacManus, Belton, Ma. Thomas) – 4:17
 "The Letter Home" (MacManus, Belton, Cassidy) – 3:10
 "Jacksons, Monk and Rowe" (MacManus, J. Thomas, Mi. Thomas) – 3:43
 "This Sad Burlesque" (MacManus, Cassidy) – 2:47
 "Romeo's Seance" (MacManus, Ma. Thomas, Mi. Thomas) – 3:32
 "I Thought I'd Write to Juliet" – 4:07
 "Last Post" (Mi. Thomas, traditional) – 2:24
 "The First to Leave" – 4:59
 "Damnation's Cellar" – 3:25
 "The Birds Will Still Be Singing" – 4:27

2006 bonus disc
Tracks 2–4, 10, 11 and 17 are previously unissued.

 "She Moved Through the Fair" (traditional) – 4:46 released on Lament by the Brodsky Quartet June 1994
 "Pills and Soap" – 4:37 live at the Meltdown Festival, Queen Elizabeth Hall, 28 June 1995
 "King of the Unknown Sea" (M. Thomas) – 3:51 live at the Meltdown Festival, Queen Elizabeth Hall, 28 June 1995
 "Skeleton" (M. Thomas) – 4:54 live at the Meltdown Festival, Queen Elizabeth Hall, 28 June 1995
 "More Than Rain" (Tom Waits) – 3:25 released on Live at New York Town Hall September 1993
 "God Only Knows" (Brian Wilson) – 4:00 released on Live at New York Town Hall September 1993
 "They Didn't Believe Me" (Jerome Kern) – 4:01 released on Live at New York Town Hall September 1993
 "O Mistress Mine" (with John Harle) (Harle) – 4:03 released on Terror & Magnificence by John Harle May 1997
 "Come Away, Death" (with John Harle) (Harle) – 4:30 released on Terror & Magnificence by John Harle May 1997
 "Put Away Forbidden Playthings" (with Fretwork) – 4:12 live at the Meltdown Festival, Queen Elizabeth Hall, 1 July 1995
 "Can She Excuse My Wrongs" (with Fretwork and The Composers Ensemble) (John Dowland) – 4:05 live at the Meltdown Festival, Queen Elizabeth Hall, 28 June 1995
 "Fire Suite 1" (with Roy Nathanson and Cyrus Chestnut) (Roy Nathanson) – 5:29 released on Fire at Keaton's Bar & Grill March 2000
 "Fire Suite 3" (with Roy Nathanson) (Nathanson) – 3:19 released on Fire at Keaton's Bar & Grill March 2000
 "Fire Suite Reprise" (with Roy Nathanson) (Nathanson) – 2:39 released on Fire at Keaton's Bar & Grill March 2000
 "Gigi" (with Bill Frisell) (Alan Jay Lerner, Frederick Loewe) – 4:14 live at the Meltdown Festival, Queen Elizabeth Hall, 25 June 1995, and released on Deep Dead Blue
 "Deep Dead Blue" (with Bill Frisell) (Bill Frisell) – 3:45 live at the Meltdown Festival, Queen Elizabeth Hall, 25 June 1995, and released on Deep Dead Blue
 "Upon a Veil of Midnight Blue" (with the Punishing Kiss Band) – 4:36 live at the Meltdown Festival, Queen Elizabeth Hall, 28 June 1995
 "Lost in the Stars" (Kurt Weill) – 3:56 released on September Songs: The Music of Kurt Weill August 1997

Personnel
 Elvis Costello – vocal
 Ian Belton – violin
 Michael Thomas – violin
 Paul Cassidy – viola
 Jaqueline Thomas – cello

Charts
Album

References

External links
 

1993 classical albums
Elvis Costello albums
Warner Records albums
Rhino Records albums
Collaborative albums
Concept albums
Song cycles